State Road 32 is an IB-class road in southwestern Serbia and Kosovo, connecting Ribariće with Mitrovica.

Before the new road categorization regulation given in 2013, the route wore the following names: M 2 (before 2012) / 33 (after 2012).

The existing route is a main road with two traffic lanes. By the valid Space Plan of the Republic of Serbia, it's section of the road is not planned for upgrading to a motorway and is expected to be conditioned in its current state.

The road is a part of European routes E65 and E80.

Sections

See also 
 Roads in Serbia
 Roads in Kosovo

Notes

References

External links 
 Official website - Roads of Serbia (Putevi Srbije)
 Official website - Corridors of Serbia (Koridori Srbije) (Serbian)

State roads in Serbia